Preah Ram II (died 1597), also known as Ram II Cau Ban Sur, was the Cambodian king who ruled from 1596 to 1597. He was an usurper.

Preah Ram II was a son-in-law of Preah Ram I. He seized power after the death of his predecessor. He was assassinated in March (or April) 1597 by a rebel named Kaev Brah Bhloen, who proclaimed himself king in Phnom Penh.

Learning about the death of Preah Ram II, the Spaniards attacked Cambodia and crowned Barom Reachea II as king in May 1597.

See also
Cambodian–Spanish War

References

1597 deaths
16th-century Cambodian monarchs